Suresnes–Mont-Valérien is a railway station in the town Suresnes, Hauts-de-Seine department, in the western suburbs of Paris, France.

External links

 

Railway stations in Hauts-de-Seine
Railway stations in France opened in 1840